William Woodhouse may refer to:
William Woodhouse (cricketer) (1856–1938), English cricketer
William Woodhouse (artist) ((1857–1939), English artist
William John Woodhouse (1866–1937), English classical scholar and author
William Woodhouse (naval officer) (before 1517–1564), English naval officer and MP for Great Yarmouth, Norfolk and Norwich
William Woodhouse (MP for Aldeburgh), MP for Aldeburgh 1604-11 and 1614-21

See also
William Wodehouse, MP for Norfolk in 1734